ASX is the Australian Securities Exchange.

ASX may also refer to:
 Advanced Stream Redirector, a type of XML metafile
 Armstrong Siddeley ASX, a jet engine
 ASE Group's NYSE stock symbol
 Mitsubishi ASX, a sport utility vehicle
 John F. Kennedy Memorial Airport's IATA airport code

See also
 Asx motif, a commonly occurring feature in proteins and polypeptides
 Asx turn, a structural feature in proteins and polypeptides
 Asymptomatic